Carlo Ritaccio (born January 9, 2000) is an American soccer player who plays as a defender for MLS Next Pro club Chicago Fire II.

Career

Youth
Ritaccio began playing club soccer at local side BW Gottschee, before getting recruited to play at the IMG Academy in Bradenton, Florida. He returned to BW Gottschee, who he helped tobe champions of the Northeast Academy Conference in the 2016-17 season, and were ranked top 20 nationally.

While at youth level, Ritaccio was called up to various youth levels of the United States national team, joining camps at under-14, under-15, under-17 and under-19 level.

College 
In 2018, Ritaccio began his college soccer career at the University of Akron. In four seasons with the Zips, Ritaccio made 58 appearances, scoring seven goals and tallying two assists. During his college career, he picked accolades including National Freshman of the Year by TopDrawerSoccer.com, as well as being tabbed to their Freshman Best XI first team in 2018, first-team All-MAC honoree, and was tabbed a third-team All-North United Soccer Coaches Regional selection in 2019, Second-Team All-MAC honoree and Academic All-MAC selection in 2020, and Academic All-MAC selection, as well as being recognized as First-Team Academic All-Ohio recipient in 2021.

While at college, Ritaccio also played in the USL League Two, spending the summer of 2019 with New York Red Bulls U-23 side, where he made three appearances, before joining Long Island Rough Riders to make six appearances. He then returned to join the Rough Riders in 2021, playing in two regular season games. During this spell, he was named to the USL League Two's '20 under 20' list.

Professional
On January 11, 2022, Ritaccio was selected 63rd overall in the 2022 MLS SuperDraft by Chicago Fire. On March 10, 2022, he signed a professional contract with Chicago's MLS Next Pro side Chicago Fire FC II ahead of the league's inaugural season. During the 2022 season, he went on to make 19 appearances for the club.

Personal
Carlo's younger brother, Matteo, is also a professional soccer player, who currently plays with the Liverpool academy. His older brother, Giraldo, also played college soccer, spending four seasons at SUNY Oneonta.

References

2000 births
Living people
American soccer players
Association football defenders
Chicago Fire FC draft picks
IMG Academy Bradenton players
Long Island Rough Riders players
MLS Next Pro players
New York Red Bulls U-23 players
People from Westbury, New York
Soccer players from New York (state)
United States men's youth international soccer players
USL League Two players
Chicago Fire FC II players
Sportspeople from Nassau County, New York
Akron Zips men's soccer players